Wimshurst is an English surname. Notable people with the surname include:

Henry Wimshurst (1804–1884), English shipbuilder
James Wimshurst (1832–1903), English inventor, engineer and shipwright
Wimshurst machine, an electrostatic generator
Ken Wimshurst (1938–2017), English footballer and manager

English-language surnames